Rhine Creek may refer to:

Rhine Creek (Iowa)
Rhine Creek (Minnesota)
Rhine Creek (West Virginia)